Niels Feijen (born 3 February 1977, The Hague) is a Dutch professional pool player, from the Hague. His nickname is "the Terminator". In 2014 he won the WPA World 9-ball championship.

Career
In 2001, Feijen reached the finals of a nine-ball tournament in Tokyo, Japan. The event had a field of more than 700 players and offered the largest prize money at that time. However, he lost to Efren Reyes.  In 2004, he won the inaugural Skins Billiards Championship with prize money of US$42,500.  Feijen has won the European straight pool championship five times.  In 2005 he was the winner of the Big Apple Nine-ball Championship, held in Queens, New York, an event with 128 of the world's best players. He represented Europe in the 2001, 2004–5, 2007-9 and 2011-16 Mosconi Cup events.

Feijen won the 2007 $50,000 winner-take-all International Challenge of Champions by defeating Lee Van Corteza. In 2008, Feijen won the World Straight Pool Championship with a victory over Francisco Bustamante in the finals. On 5 October 2008, he received the 3rd prize of $25,000 in the inaugural WPA World Ten-ball Championship.

In 2010, Feijen reached the finals of the WPA World Eight-ball Championship but ended up in 2nd place losing to Karl Boyes of Great Britain. He would reach the finals of that same tournament again the next year, and was defeated by Dennis Orcollo of the Philippines.
2014 has been the best year so far for Feijen, who won the European Straight Pool Championship, the European 9-ball Championship and the 2014 WPA World Nine-ball Championship. In 2015 he was voted Most Valuable Player of the Mosconi Cup for the fourth time in the last five years.

Feijen has been a winner of events on the Euro Tour on 11 occasions, putting him third only behind Ralf Souquet (23) and Oliver Ortmann (14) in number of victories on the tour. His latest victory was at the 2022 Austria Open.

Career titles
 2022 Euro Tour Austria Open
 2022 European Pool Championship 9-Ball
 2019 Diamond Las Vegas Open
 2019 WPA Players Championship Consolation Event 
 2018 Kremlin Cup 
 2018 European Pool Championship 14.1
 2018 World Pool Masters 
 2017 Predator Bucharest Open 
 2017 European Pool Championship 14.1
 2016 Mosconi Cup
 2016 American Straight Pool Championship 
 2016 Euro Tour Dutch Open
 2016 Predator Bucharest Open 
 2015 Mosconi Cup (MVP)
 2015 Mosconi Cup
 2015 Euro Tour Austria Open
 2015 European Pool Championship 8-Ball
 2015 Euro Tour Italian Open
 2014 Mosconi Cup (MVP)
 2014 Mosconi Cup
 2014 European Pool Championship 14.1
 2014 WPA World Nine-ball Championship
 2014 European Pool Championship 9-Ball
 2013 Mosconi Cup (MVP)
 2013 Mosconi Cup
 2013 European Pool Championship 9-Ball
 2013 Euro Tour Austria Open
 2013 World Pool Masters
 2012 Mosconi Cup
 2011 Mosconi Cup (MVP)
 2011 Mosconi Cup
 2010 Euro Tour French Open
 2009 Euro Tour French Open
 2008 Mosconi Cup
 2008 Euro Tour Costa del Sol Open
 2008 WPA World Straight Pool Championship
 2007 Mosconi Cup
 2007 Derby City Classic 9-Ball 
 2007 International Challenge of Champions 
 2007 European Pool Championship 14.1
 2005 Euro Tour Netherlands Open
 2005 Big Apple 9-Ball Championship
 2005 Euro Tour Belgium Open
 2004 European Pool Championship 14.1
 2004 Skins Billiards Championship
 2003 European Pool Championship 14.1
 2002 European Pool Championship 14.1
 2001 Euro Tour Finland Open

References

External links
 WorldPoolMasters.com 2006 profile of Niels Feijen
 AzBilliards.com 14 August 2005 report on Niels Feijen's win of the 2005 Big Apple Nine-ball Classic
 Niels Feijen 2008 World 14.1 Championship Winning Video 

1977 births
Living people
Dutch pool players
Sportspeople from The Hague
World champions in pool
WPA World Nine-ball Champions
Competitors at the 2005 World Games